The Comunidade Intermunicipal do Baixo Alentejo (English: Lower Alentejo) is an administrative division in Portugal. It was created in 2009. It is also a NUTS3 subregion of the Alentejo Region. The seat of the intermunicipal community is Beja. Baixo Alentejo comprises 13 of the 14 municipalities of the Beja District. The population in 2011 was 126,692, in an area of 8,542.72 km².

It is bordered on the North by Alentejo Central Subregion, on the East by Spain, on the South by the Algarve and on the West by Alentejo Litoral. It covers the Eastern part of the former Baixo Alentejo Province.

Municipalities

It is composed of 13 municipalities:

References

External links

Official website CIM Baixo Alentejo

Intermunicipal communities of Portugal